Joseph Bernardo (born 31 May 1929) is a French swimmer and Olympic medalist. He married actress and theater director Simone Turck in 1952.

Career
Bernardo was born in Algiers, French Algeria. He competed at the 1952 Olympic Games in Helsinki, where he received a bronze medal in 4 x 200 m freestyle relay with the French swimming team (with Jean Boiteux, Aldo Eminente and Alexandre Jany).

References

External links

1929 births
Living people
Sportspeople from Algiers
Olympic swimmers of France
Swimmers at the 1948 Summer Olympics
Swimmers at the 1952 Summer Olympics
Olympic bronze medalists for France
World record setters in swimming
Olympic bronze medalists in swimming
French male freestyle swimmers
European Aquatics Championships medalists in swimming
Medalists at the 1952 Summer Olympics
Medalists at the 1948 Summer Olympics
Pieds-Noirs
Mediterranean Games gold medalists for France
Mediterranean Games medalists in swimming
Swimmers at the 1951 Mediterranean Games
French people of colonial Algeria